Sankt Oswald bei Haslach is an Austrian municipality located in the state of Upper Austria in the district of Rohrbach.

Population

References

Cities and towns in Rohrbach District